"Say When" is a song recorded by the American country music group Lonestar, written by then band member John Rich along with Larry Boone and Paul Nelson.  It was released in January 1998 as the third single from their second album Crazy Nights (1997). It peaked at number 13 on the U.S. Billboard Hot Country Singles & Tracks chart and at number 23 on the Canadian RPM Country Tracks chart.

Critical reception
The song received a positive review in Billboard, saying "This sweet ballad looks sure to accelerate [the band's] momentum at country radio."

Chart positions
"Say When" debuted at number 65 on the U.S. Billboard Hot Country Singles & Tracks for the week of January 31, 1998.

References

1998 singles
1997 songs
Lonestar songs
Songs written by John Rich
Songs written by Larry Boone
Song recordings produced by Don Cook
BNA Records singles
Songs written by Paul Nelson (songwriter)